Henry or Harry Street may refer to:

People
Henry Street (cricketer) (1863–1953), English cricketer
Harry Street (rugby league) (1927–2002), English professional rugby league footballer
Henry Street (vintner) (died 2014), American vintner
Harry Street (spree killer) (1944–2014), British spree killer
Harry Street (jurist) (1919–1984), British jurist and legal scholar

Places
Henry Street High School, a school in Whitby, Ontario, Canada
Henry Street Settlement, a charity home in Manhattan, New York
Henry Street, Dublin, Ireland
Henry Street, Fremantle, Western Australia
Henry Street, Limerick, Ireland
Henry Street (Manhattan), New York, United States
Virginia State Route 132, Virginia, United States, known for most of its length as Henry Street

Other
Henry Street Gang, a criminal gang in Chicago, Illinois, United States

Street, Henry